Marion County is a county located in the U.S. state of Texas. As of the 2020 census, its population was 9,725. Its county seat is Jefferson. Marion County is in East Texas and is named for Francis Marion, the Revolutionary War general from South Carolina who was nicknamed the "Swamp Fox".

History

Native Americans

The indigenous farming Caddoan Mississippian culture has been dated to 200 BCE in the area. The Hernando de Soto expedition of 1541 resulted in violent encounters with Native Americans.  Spanish and French missionaries carried endemic diseases: resulting in epidemics of smallpox, measles malaria, and influenza among the Caddo. Eventually, the Caddo were forced to reservations. Shashidahnee (Timber Hill) is the last known permanent Marion County settlement of the Caddo people. During the 19th century, Shawnee, Delaware, and Kickapoo migrated to the area and settled here.

County established

The legislature formed Marion County from Cass County in 1860 and named it for Revolutionary War Swamp Fox Francis Marion.  Jefferson, named after Thomas Jefferson became the county seat.

The majority of the settlers had migrated from other southern states and brought enslaved African Americans with them as workers, or purchased them in slave markets. The county was developed as cotton plantations, and enslaved African Americans made up 51 percent of the population in 1860. In 1861, the white male voters in the county voted unanimously for secession from the Union. The county benefited financially from Confederate government contracts.

In February 1869 the river steamboat Mittie Stephens caught fire from a torch basket that ignited a hay stack on board. Sixty-one people died, either from the fire or from being caught in the boat's paddlewheel as they jumped overboard.

Following the Civil War, the white minority used violence to impose dominance on the freedmen. On October 4, 1869, George Washington Smith, a delegate to the state Constitutional Convention, was murdered by a band of vigilantes while incarcerated in Jefferson. Smith's slaying resulted in the federal government assigning military troops to Jefferson. They offered some protection for the black majority during the Reconstruction era.

During Reconstruction, Republican presidential races were supported by the black majority voters in the county. However, with the end of Reconstruction, white conservative Democrats regained control of the state legislature and, in 1898, passed various restrictions on voter registration and voting, including establishing White primaries. Because the Democratic Party dominated the state, its primaries afforded the only true competitive political races. Blacks were unable to vote in these primaries and were thus disenfranchised. Various forms of the white primary survived until 1944 when a US Supreme Court ruling overturned the practice as racially discriminatory and unconstitutional.

The Marion County brick courthouse was erected in 1914, designed by architect Elmer George Withers. In the early 20th century, the Dick Taylor Camp of Confederate veterans erected a monument to honor the county's dead in the American Civil War, placing it outside the courthouse.

Caddo Lake State Park was first proposed in 1924. From 1933 to 1937, during the Great Depression, men were hired into the Civilian Conservation Corps and made improvements to the park. The former army barracks and mess hall were converted to log cabins and a recreation hall for park goers.

Geography

Major highways

  U.S. Highway 59
  Interstate 369 is under construction and will follow the current route of U.S. 59 in most places.
  State Highway 43
  State Highway 49
  State Highway 155
  Farm to Market Road 134
  Farm to Market Road 248
  Farm to Market Road 2208
  Farm to Market Road 726
  Farm to Market Road 729
  Farm to Market Road 727
  Farm to Market Road 805
  Farm to Market Road 2683

The TTC-69 component (recommended preferred) of the once-planned Trans-Texas Corridor went through Marion County.

Adjacent counties and parish
 Cass County (north)
 Caddo Parish, Louisiana (east)
 Harrison County (south)
 Upshur County (west)
 Morris County (northwest)

Communities
 Corinth
 Jefferson (county seat)
 Pine Harbor
 Warlock

Demographics

Note: the US Census treats Hispanic/Latino as an ethnic category. This table excludes Latinos from the racial categories and assigns them to a separate category. Hispanics/Latinos can be of any race.

According to the 2000 U.S. census, there were 10,941 people, 4,610 households, and 3,120 families residing in the county. The population density was 29 people per square mile (11/km2). There were 6,384 housing units at an average density of 17 per square mile (6/km2). The racial makeup of the county was 72.74% White, 23.91% Black or African American, 0.80% Native American, 0.22% Asian, 0.01% Pacific Islander, 0.79% from other races, and 1.54% from two or more races.  2.40% of the population were Hispanic or Latino of any race. The 2020 United States census reported a population of 9,725. Its racial and ethnic makeup in 2020 was 70.63% non-Hispanic white, 18.98% Black or African American, 0.71% Native American, 0.49% Asian, 0.46% some other race, 4.72% multiracial, and 4.0% Hispanic or Latino of any race.

The median income for a household in the county was $25,347, and the median income for a family was $32,039. Males had a median income of $30,584 versus $17,885 for females. The per capita income for the county was $14,535.  About 17.80% of families and 22.40% of the population were below the poverty line, including 29.90% of those under age 18 and 14.40% of those age 65 or over. According to the 2020 American Community Survey, the median household income was $39,093.

Politics

See also

 Museums in East Texas
 National Register of Historic Places listings in Marion County, Texas
 Recorded Texas Historic Landmarks in Marion County

References

External links
 Marion County government website
 
 Inventory of the county archives of Texas : Marion County, no. 158, hosted by the Portal to Texas History

 
1860 establishments in Texas
Populated places established in 1860